This is a list of American football players who have played for the Washington Commanders, as well as its predecessors, the Boston Braves (1932) Boston Redskins (1933–1936), Washington Redskins (1937–2019), and Washington Football Team (2020–2021) in the National Football League (NFL).  It includes players that have played at least five games in the NFL regular season.  The Washington Redskins franchise was founded in Boston, Massachusetts as the Boston Braves, named after the local baseball franchise.  The name was changed the next year to the Redskins.  In 1937, the franchise moved to Washington, D.C.

The Redskins played over 1,000 games.  In those games, the club won five professional American football championships including two NFL Championships and three Super Bowls.  The franchise captured ten NFL divisional titles and six NFL conference championships.

Overall, the Redskins had a total of 23 players and coaches (17 primary, six minor) inducted into the Pro Football Hall of Fame.  Many Redskins players have also had successful college football careers, including six who were Heisman Trophy winners:  Gary Beban, Desmond Howard, Vic Janowicz, George Rogers, Danny Wuerffel, and Robert Griffin III.  In addition, the Heisman Trophy sculpture was modeled after Ed Smith in 1934, who became a Redskins player in 1936.

Several former players became head coach of the Redskins, including Turk Edwards, Dick Todd, and Jack Pardee. In addition, former players have become assistant coaches, such as Earnest Byner, Russ Grimm, Greg Manusky, and Keenan McCardell.  Other players have also become successful in non-sport activities, like acting (Terry Crews and Jamal Duff) and politics (Tom Osborne and Heath Shuler).

Players on the Commanders have also been related from time to time.  In 1957, Redskins end Joe Walton became the first son of an NFL player to play in the league.  His father, Frank Walton also played on the Redskins.  Joe Krakoski and his son, also named Joe Krakoski, also both played for the Redskins.  In addition, four sets of brothers have played with each other while on the Redskins: Chris and Nic Clemons, Cecil and Ray Hare, Ed and Robert Khayat, and Dan and Matt Turk.

Key

Players
 

Updated as of the 2021 NFL season

A

B

C

D

E

F

G

H

I

J

K

L

M

N

O

P

Q

R

S

T

U

V

W

Y

Z

Other notable players
These players have not played five games for the Commanders, but are still notable in their own right.

Notes
a  Replacement players that played in all three games of the 1987 players strike are also included and identified.
b  Primary refers to the team or teams on which the Hall of Famer made his primary contribution to professional football.  Minor refers to a Hall of Famer who spent only a minor portion of their career with a team.
c  The Redskins did not start recording jersey numbers until the 1937 season when they moved to Washington, DC.
d  For a full description of positions see American football positions.

References

External links
 All-time roster
 History: All-time roster database

Washington Commanders
 
 
Players